The Nehalem Highway No. 102 (see Oregon highways and routes) is a state highway in the U.S. state of Oregon that passes through the Nehalem River valley. It runs from U.S. Route 101 (US 101) in Astoria southeast to Oregon Route 8 (OR 8) in Forest Grove. Between Astoria and the Mist–Clatskanie Highway No. 110 in Mist, it is signed as Oregon Route 202 while the rest is signed as OR 47.  A piece of the highway in Astoria, north of the Warrenton–Astoria Highway No. 105, is also US 101 Business.

Route description
The western terminus of the Nehalem Highway No. 102 is a roundabout with US 101 in Astoria.  Here, US 101 Business and OR 202 travel along the eastern shore of Youngs Bay, where US 101 Business splits away to the south, and the Youngs River.  Soon after, it enters the valley of the Nehalem River, and continues southeast towards the community of Jewell.  Leaving Jewell, it then continues east-northeast to the town of Mist, where OR 202 ends.  The Nehalem Highway continues southeast from there, as OR 47.

Though in the mountainous Northern Oregon Coast Range, the Nehalem Highway itself is a winding road, as it follows the banks of the Nehalem River from Jewell while passing through Vernonia and Pittsburg. Near Buxton, the highway meets US 26, which carries the Sunset Highway No. 47. The Nehalem Highway and OR 47 split away from US 26 and the Sunset Highway and travels through the town of Banks. It ends at an intersection with OR 8, the Tualatin Valley Highway No. 29.

History
In the early part of the 20th century, it followed the Nehalem River all the way to Timber, crossing the divide of the Northern Oregon Coast Range there and then going down Gales Creek to Forest Grove, instead of going down Dairy Creek as it has since about 1940.

Major intersections

References

External links

Named state highways in Oregon
Transportation in Washington County, Oregon
U.S. Route 101